Cardewlees is a hamlet in Cumbria, England, historically part of Cumberland. It is located northwest of Dalston (of which parish it belongs to), north of Cardew and northeast of Thursby, just off the A595 road. A windmill located here has been converted into apartments. Thursby Manor is located nearby. Cardewlees hit the headlines in 1862 when resident Sarah Carrick poisoned herself with phosphorus paste, or rat poison.

Archaeologically it is known for The Cardewlees Altar.

Notable people
It is the birthplace of John Wilson, an architect with the Board of Ordnance who was responsible for some of the Regency buildings in the island of Guernsey.

See also
List of places in Cumbria

References

Hamlets in Cumbria
Dalston, Cumbria